The House of Lynden is one of the oldest families of the Dutch nobility, originating in the Duchy of Guelders. This family later gave rise to different branches. Most remained in the Netherlands and produced several Dutch politicians, ministers, and military leaders.

History of the family
The oldest van Lynden (Linde) is mentioned in the year 1307 ("Uradel"). The family takes its name from the village Lienden in the Dutch province of Gelderland. Members carry the title of baron or count.

Notable members
Constantijn Theodoor van Lynden van Sandenburg, Prime Minister of the Netherlands.

Heraldry
This coat of arms is depicted in the medieval Gelre Armorial (folio 89v).

Places related to the family
 Ter Lede Castle, Lienden
Lyndenstein

Literature
 'Van Lynden', Nederland's Adelsboek 87 (1998),pp. 547–649.
 Detlev Schwennicke, Europäische Stammtafeln Band XXVIII (2012) Tafel 81.

References

Lynden, van
Barons of the Netherlands